The R516 is a Regional Route in South Africa.

Route
Taking its western origin from the R511 near Thabazimbi. The road runs east to Bela-Bela (Warmbaths), where it meets, and is briefly cosigned with, the R101. It crosses the N1, before the R576 coming from the east-south-east, meets it at a t-junction. The R516 continues east, but then starts to turn north-east, crossing the R33 and then ending its journey at the R519 between Mookgophong (Naboomspruit) and Roedtan.

References

Regional Routes in Limpopo